Friedrich Moroder, also known as Rico (born 21 March 1880, Ortisei in Val Gardena; died 24 January 1937) was a South Tyrolean sculptor.

Biography
He was the first born son of the painter Josef Moroder Lusenberg and the Felizita Unterplatzer in Ortisei in Val Gardena. He learned how to sculpt in his father's workshop. His two sons, Viktor and Bruno, were also trained as sculptors in his workshop in Ortisei. During the First World War he was sent to Galicia to the Russian front, like many Tyrolean firefighters.
His sculpting style was mainly focused on the creation of sacred art and for church equipment. Moroder married Runggaldier Genoveva on 11 October 1904.

Gallery

References

1880 births
1937 deaths
Italian male sculptors
20th-century Italian sculptors
20th-century Italian male artists
19th-century Italian sculptors
Ladin people
People from Urtijëi
Moroder family
19th-century Italian male artists